The 1965 Southeast Asian Peninsular Games, officially known as the 3rd Southeast Asian Peninsular Games, was a Southeast Asian multi-sport event held in Kuala Lumpur, Malaysia, from 14 to 21 December 1965 with 14 sports featured in the games. Originally to be hosted by Laos, the third edition of the games was hosted by Malaysia after the former was not able to honour its hosting commitment citing financial difficulties and would later known to have hosted the 2009 Southeast Asian Games decades later. Two years earlier, the third SEAP Games was cancelled as Cambodia pulled out of hosting the event due to internal strife. This was the first time Malaysia host the games. Malaysia is the third country to host the Southeast Asian Peninsular Games, which later known as the Southeast Asian Games after Thailand and Myanmar, then Burma. The games was opened and closed by Ismail Nasiruddin, the King of Malaysia at the Stadium Merdeka. The final medal tally was led by Thailand followed by host Malaysia and Singapore.

The games

Participating nations

  (135)
  (40)
  (20)
  (host) (189)
  (114)
  (121)
  (186)

Sports

Medal table

Key

References

External links
 History of the SEA Games
 Medal Tally 1959–1995
 Medal Tally
 OCA SEA Games
 SEA Games previous medal table
 SEAGF Office  
 SEA Games members

 

Southeast Asian Games
S
S
Southeast Asian Peninsular Games, 1965
Multi-sport events in Malaysia
Sport in Kuala Lumpur
Southeast Asian Peninsular Games
1960s in Kuala Lumpur